Košutovo may refer to several inhabited places:
Košutovo, Leposavić
Koshtovë, Mitrovica